Gavras, also transliterated Gabras or Gauras, is a Greek surname. It can refer to:

 Gabras, a Byzantine noble family with which the surname originated
Costa-Gavras (born 1933), Greek-French filmmaker
Alexandre Gavras (born 1969), French producer
Julie Gavras (born 1970), French filmmaker
Romain Gavras (born 1981), French filmmaker

Greek-language surnames
Surnames